Håkon Paulsberg (born 26 July 1952 in Hunndalen, Norway) is a Norwegian musician and singer-songwriter, the father of the jazz saxophonist Hanna Paulsberg, now living in Rygge, Østfold. He is known for cooperations with musical profiles like Jan Erik Vold, Arne Domnerus and Clifford Jordan and composing music to lyrics by poets like Georg Johannesen.

Career 
Paulsberg has extensive experience as a drummer in a variety of styles, and has a long career as a musician. From 1980 until date, he has been active in different bands, but has also collaborated with international jazz profiles like Arne Domnerus and Clifford Jordan. At the end of the 90 Paulsberg changed role from being a drummer to become a guitarist and singer-songwriter with the album Jinter (1999) in which he interprets the lyrics of Alf Prøysen. This has led to collaborations like with the poet Jan Erik Vold. Today Paulsberg is developing his own style and are working to make music to poems by various writers, such as Georg Johannesen.

Discography

Solo albums 
1999: Jinter (Gramofon), with lyrics by Alf Prøysen
2006: Kong J (Gramofon), with lyrics by Georg Johannesen

Collaborations 
With Pastor Wang Quintet 
2004: Pastorale (Wango)

References

External links 

1952 births
Living people
Musicians from Gjøvik
Norwegian singer-songwriters
Norwegian jazz guitarists
Norwegian male guitarists
Norwegian male singers
Male jazz musicians
Musicians from Rygge